Kot Bhutta also known as Kot Bhatti, is a Village Near Eminabad  in Gujranwala District located in Punjab, Pakistan,.  Village. The village is located near Eminabad Road.

History 
The history of Kot Bhutta is about 350 years. There is a shrine of a Sufi Saint, Pir Ahmad Din, and Urs is held every year.

References

External links 
Google Map of Kamoke - WikiMapia Sub Maps of Kamoke

Villages in Gujranwala District